Invention is an early composition by Hungarian composer György Ligeti. It is scored for solo piano and was composed in 1948.

Composition 

At the time of the composition, Hungary had gone through World War II and was about to enter a Stalinist era, which would last seven years. At that time, Ligeti was 24 years old and was still a student at the Franz Liszt Academy of Music. Very influenced by the style of Béla Bartók, Ligeti wrote the composition in 1948, as an academic composition for Sandor Veress's classes. It was dedicated to György Kurtág, a fellow student of his, and was later published by Schott Music together with Ligeti's 1947 Due capricci, even though they were composed a year apart and were conceived separately.

Analysis 

This is a very short composition for piano, which takes around one minute to perform. When asked to write a Bach-like invention, Ligeti wrote it with his own harmonic style. This two-part invention shows a very profusely used counterpoint and features highly chromatic melodic segments. It is a very quick piece, marked Risoluto, ♩ = 88, and gravitates towards F.

Notable recordings 

Following is a list of some of the most notable recordings of this composition:

See also 

 List of compositions by György Ligeti
 List of solo piano compositions by György Ligeti
 Due capricci (Ligeti)

References

External links 
 A preview of the score

Compositions by György Ligeti
1948 compositions
Compositions for solo piano
Contemporary classical compositions